Hopeful (also, Hopewell, Cheaha, Davis, and Hopefull) is an unincorporated community in Talladega County, Alabama, United States. The community was named for Hopeful Church of Christ, which was founded in 1878.

Notable person

Howie Camp former Major League Baseball player

References

Unincorporated communities in Talladega County, Alabama
Unincorporated communities in Alabama